Daniel Svensson (born 12 February 2002) is a Swedish footballer who plays for FC Nordsjælland as a left back.

References

External links 
 

2002 births
Living people
Swedish footballers
Sweden under-21 international footballers
Sweden youth international footballers
Ettan Fotboll players
Danish Superliga players
IF Brommapojkarna players
FC Nordsjælland players
Association football defenders
Swedish expatriate footballers
Expatriate men's footballers in Denmark
Swedish expatriate sportspeople in Denmark
Footballers from Stockholm